The American comic book character Superman has appeared in many types of various media. Since the 1930s, Superman has appeared in radio, television, movies, and video games each on multiple occasions, and his name, symbol, and image have appeared on products and merchandise.

Portrayals
Among the actors who have played Superman/Superboy (and/or his alter ego, Clark Kent) are:

Portrayed by

Voice only

Radio and audio
1940s: The Adventures of Superman – radio series starring Bud Collyer and Joan Alexander
1966: The Adventures of Superman – vinyl LP featuring Bob Holiday as Superman
1970s–1980s: various Superman-related vinyl albums from Peter Pan Records
1993: Superman Lives! – BBC Radio Light Entertainment, BBC Radio 5; Superman is voiced by Stuart Milligan
1995: DC Comics Super Heroes – Attack of the Elementals – audio drama featuring the Justice League; Superman is voiced by David Earl Waterman
2008: The Never-Ending Battle – Graphic Audio; Superman voiced by James Konicek

Film

Animated film
1941–1943: Fleischer Studios/Famous Studios' Superman theatrical cartoon – series of 17 shorts initially starring Bud Collyer
1945: She-Sick Sailors – (cameo) – as comic book. Olive Oyl's seen reading the Superman comics. The rest of this Popeye short is then a parody of Superman.
1992: Tiny Toon Adventures: How I Spent My Vacation – direct-to-video, featuring Maurice LaMarche as Superman
1999: The Iron Giant – (cameo) – as comic book.
2006: Superman: Brainiac Attacks – direct-to-video film utilizing character designs from Superman: The Animated Series; starring Tim Daly and Dana Delany
2007: Superman: Doomsday – direct-to-video from DC Comics featuring Adam Baldwin as Superman
2008: Justice League: The New Frontier – direct-to-video (DC Comics) featuring Kyle MacLachlan as Superman
2009: Superman/Batman: Public Enemies – direct-to-video (DC Comics) with Tim Daly reprising his role from various DC media.
2010: Justice League: Crisis on Two Earths – direct-to-video (DC Comics); Superman is voiced by Mark Harmon
2010: Superman/Batman: Apocalypse – direct-to-video (DC Comics); Tim Daly reprises his role as Superman
2010: Batman: Under the Red Hood – direct-to-video (DC Comics); Only referenced through Amazo
2010: Superman/Shazam!: The Return of Black Adam – direct-to-video short (DC Comics) featuring George Newbern as Superman.
2011: All-Star Superman – direct-to-video (DC Comics) featuring James Denton as Superman
2012: Justice League: Doom – direct-to-video (DC Comics) featuring Tim Daly as Superman
2012: Superman vs. The Elite – direct-to-video (DC Comics) featuring George Newbern as Superman
2013: Batman: The Dark Knight Returns – direct-to-video (DC Comics) two-part adaption of the graphic novel featuring Mark Valley Superman only appears in the second part.
2013: Superman: Unbound – direct-to-video (DC Comics) featuring Matt Bomer as Superman
2013: Lego Batman: The Movie - DC Super Heroes Unite – direct-to-video (DC Comics) featuring Travis Willingham as Superman
2013: Justice League: The Flashpoint Paradox – direct-to-video (DC Comics) featuring Sam Daly, following in his father Tim's footsteps as Superman
2013: Superman 75th Anniversary - animated short by Zack Snyder and Bruce Timm created as a celebration of 75 years of the character, later reused for the character's 80th anniversary
2014: The Lego Movie – Animated film featuring Channing Tatum as Superman
2014: JLA Adventures: Trapped in Time – direct-to-video (DC Comics) featuring Peter Jessop as Superman
2014: Justice League: War – direct-to-video (DC Comics) featuring Alan Tudyk as Superman
2014: Lego Batman: Be-Leaguered – TV special featuring Nolan North as Superman
2015: Justice League: Throne of Atlantis – direct-to-video (DC Comics) featuring Jerry O'Connell as Superman
2015: Lego DC Comics Super Heroes: Justice League vs. Bizarro League – direct-to-video (DC Comics) featuring Nolan North as Superman
2015: Justice League: Gods and Monsters – direct-to-video (DC Comics) featuring a reimagined version of Superman who is the son of General Zod.
2015: Lego DC Comics Super Heroes: Justice League: Attack of the Legion of Doom – direct-to-video with Nolan North reprising his role as Superman
2016: Lego DC Comics Super Heroes: Justice League: Cosmic Clash – direct-to-video with Nolan North reprising his role
2016: Justice League vs. Teen Titans – direct-to-video (DC Comics) with Jerry O'Connell reprising his role
2017: Justice League Dark – direct-to-video (DC Comics) with Jerry O'Connell reprising his role
2017: The Lego Batman Movie – Animated film featuring Superman with Channing Tatum reprising his role.
2017: DC Super Heroes vs. Eagle Talon – Animated film featuring Kenichi Suzumura as the voice of Superman.
2018: The Death of Superman – direct-to-video (DC Comics) featuring Jerry O'Connell as Superman
2018: Teen Titans Go! To the Movies – Animated film featuring Nicolas Cage as the voice of Superman.
2019: Reign of the Supermen – direct-to-video (DC Comics) featuring Jerry O'Connell as Superman
2019: The Lego Movie 2: The Second Part – Animated film featuring Superman with Channing Tatum reprising his role.
2019: Justice League vs. the Fatal Five – Animated film featuring George Newbern as Superman.
2019: Batman: Hush – direct-to-video (DC Comics) featuring Jerry O'Connell as Superman
2020: Superman: Red Son – direct-to-video (DC Comics) featuring Jason Isaacs as Superman
2020: Justice League Dark: Apokolips War – direct-to-video (DC Comics) featuring Jerry O'Connell as Superman
2020: Superman: Man of Tomorrow – Animated film featuring Darren Criss as the voice of Superman.
2020: Batman: Death in the Family – direct-to-video interactive film featuring Superman (Clark Kent) with Nolan North reprising his role.
2021: Justice Society: World War II - direct-to-video (DC Comics) featuring Superman with Darren Criss reprising his role.
2021: Space Jam: A New Legacy - Non-speaking animated appearance
2021: Injustice – direct-to-video (DC Comics) featuring Justin Hartley as Superman
2022: DC League of Super-Pets – Animated film featuring John Krasinski as the voice of Superman
2022: Batman and Superman: Battle of the Super Sons - direct-to-video featuring Superman with Travis Willingham reprising his role from various DC Lego video games.

Live-action film
1948: Superman – a serial in 15 chapters starring Kirk Alyn and Noel Neill; recounts origin story, then fights the Spider Lady
1950: Atom Man vs. Superman – serial in 15 parts starring Kirk Alyn, Noel Neill and Lyle Talbot; fights Atom Man, Lex Luthor
1951: Superman and the Mole Men – feature film, starring George Reeves and Phyllis Coates
1954: Stamp Day for Superman – short film featuring George Reeves and Noel Neill promoting Stamp Day for the U.S. Treasury
1978: Superman – directed by Richard Donner and starring Christopher Reeve, Marlon Brando, Gene Hackman, Margot Kidder, Ned Beatty, and Valerie Perrine (ranked at no. 26 on The AFI's Top 50 Heroes list)
1979: The Return of Superman (also known as "Turkish Superman") is an adaptation of Superman from Turkey
1980: Superman II – directed by Richard Lester and starring Christopher Reeve, Gene Hackman, Margot Kidder, and Terence Stamp
1983: Superman III – directed by Richard Lester and starring Christopher Reeve, Richard Pryor, Annette O'Toole, and Robert Vaughn
1984: Supergirl – spin-off directed by Jeannot Szwarc and starring Helen Slater, Faye Dunaway, and Marc McClure (repeating his role of Jimmy Olsen from the Reeve features). Superman is seen on a poster.
1987: Superman IV: The Quest for Peace – directed by Sidney J. Furie and starring Christopher Reeve, Gene Hackman, Margot Kidder, Jon Cryer, and Mariel Hemingway
2006: Superman Returns – directed by Bryan Singer and starring Brandon Routh, Kate Bosworth, Kevin Spacey, and James Marsden (includes material featuring Marlon Brando, originally filmed for Superman (1978))
2006: Superman II: The Richard Donner Cut – New edit of Superman II, featuring around 80% new footage originally shot by director Richard Donner, including material featuring Marlon Brando
2013: Man of Steel – directed by Zack Snyder and starring Henry Cavill, Amy Adams, Russell Crowe, Kevin Costner, Diane Lane, Laurence Fishburne, and Michael Shannon
2016: Batman v Superman: Dawn of Justice – directed by Zack Snyder, the film is a sequel to Man of Steel featuring the first meeting between Superman (Henry Cavill) and Batman (Ben Affleck). Also starring Amy Adams, Jesse Eisenberg, Diane Lane, Laurence Fishburne, Jeremy Irons, Holly Hunter, and Gal Gadot.
2017: Justice League – directed by Zack Snyder, this film is a follow-up to Batman v Superman: Dawn of Justice. Cavill reprised his role as Superman. Also starring Ben Affleck, Gal Gadot, Jason Momoa, Ezra Miller, and Ray Fisher.
2019: Shazam!  – directed by David F. Sandberg, the film features Superman in a cameo at the end; he was portrayed in a brief role by stunt double Ryan Hadley.
2021: Zack Snyder's Justice League – Director's cut of Justice League, directed by Zack Snyder and starring Henry Cavill as Superman.
2022: Black Adam - directed by Jaume Collet-Serra, the film features Superman in a cameo at the end; Henry Cavill reprised his role as Superman for the last time.

Television

Live-action

Adventures of Superman

The series premiered September 19, 1952 in black & white on the television network Syndication and ended April 28, 1958. George Reeves portrays Clark Kent / Superman with Jack Larson as Jimmy Olsen, John Hamilton as Perry White, and Robert Shayne as Inspector Henderson.

Superboy

The series premiered October 8, 1988 on the television network Syndication and ended on May 17, 1992. John Haymes Newton, and later Gerard Christopher, portrays Clark Kent / Superboy with Stacy Haiduk as Lana Lang, Jim Calvert as T.J. White, Scott James Wells as Lex Luthor, Stuart Whitman and Salome Jens as Jonathan and Martha Kent.

Lois & Clark: The New Adventures of Superman

The series premiered September 12, 1993 on ABC and ended June 14, 1997. Dean Cain stars as Clark Kent / Superman alongside Teri Hatcher as Lois Lane.

Smallville

The series premiered October 16, 2001 on The WB and ended May 13, 2011. Tom Welling stars as Clark Kent and depicts the early days of Superman as Clark, before becoming the Man of Steel.

Supergirl

The series premiered October 26, 2015 on The CW and ended November 9, 2021. Tyler Hoechlin guest stars as Clark Kent / Superman alongside Bitsie Tulloch as Lois Lane.
They later appeared in annual Arrowverse crossovers such as Elseworlds and Crisis on Infinite Earths.

Krypton

The series premiered March 21, 2018 on Syfy and ended August 14, 2019. It primarily focuses on Superman's grandfather.

Superman & Lois

The series premiered February 23, 2021 on The CW. Clark Kent / Superman and Lois Lane are the main characters in television series set in the Arrowverse, with Hoechlin and Tulloch reprising their roles.

Peacemaker

Superman made an appearance in the Peacemaker season finale episode "It's Cow or Never" portrayed by a stand-in.

Untitled Superman series
It was announced by Collider that Michael B. Jordan will be developing, producing and starring as Val-Zod in a limited series for HBO Max.

Animated television
1966–1969: Various Superman series by Filmation – Bud Collyer as Superman and Bob Hastings as Superboy
1966: The New Adventures of Superman
1967: The Superman-Aquaman Hour of Adventure – included three Justice League of America shorts (also featuring Collyer as Superman)
1968–1969: The Batman-Superman Hour
1969: Superman is mentioned by Ernie in the television promotional special This Way to Sesame Street when he discusses to Bert about celebrities visiting the street including Burt Lancaster, James Earl Jones, Mahalia Jackson, Batman, Kermit the Frog, and Carol Burnett.
1970: Lennie Weinrib voices Superman in a Sesame Street sketch for a lecture of words beginning with "S" which happens to be the character's favorite letter of the Alphabet.
1972: Superman / Clark Kent and Lois Lane all appear in The Brady Kids episode "Cindy's Super Friend". 
1973–1985: Various Super Friends series produced by Hanna-Barbera; Danny Dark as Superman
1973: Super Friends
1977: The All-New Super Friends Hour
1978: Challenge of the Super Friends
1979: The World's Greatest Super Friends
1980–83: Super Friends
1984: Super Friends: The Legendary Super Powers Show
1985: The Super Powers Team: Galactic Guardians
1988: Superman – TV series based on the "new" DC Comics Superman; produced by Ruby-Spears; starring Beau Weaver and Ginny McSwain. Animated by Toei Animation, Japan
1996: Superman: The Animated Series – TV series, voiced by Tim Daly
2005: Krypto the Superdog – TV series; Superman voiced by Michael Daingerfield (appears in episode one)
2006–2008: Legion of Super Heroes (Warner Bros.); featuring Yuri Lowenthal as Superman
2007–2008: The Batman (Warner Bros.) – Superman is featured in the two-part season five premiere, "The Batman/Superman Story" and the two-part series finale, "Lost Heroes"; George Newbern reprises the role
2010–2013, 2019: Young Justice (Warner Bros.); features Nolan North as Superman
2012: Mad – When their fellow heroes feel under-appreciated, they appeal to Superman, Batman, and Wonder Woman about being called "Super Friends"
2012–2015: Robot Chicken DC Comics Specials, featuring Breckin Meyer as Superman
2012: Robot Chicken DC Comics Special
2014: Robot Chicken DC Comics Special 2: Villains in Paradise
2015: Robot Chicken DC Comics Special III: Magical Friendship
2016–2018: Justice League Action (Warner Bros.); a series featuring a rotating cast of Justice League members including Superman played by Jason J. Lewis.
2019–2021: DC Super Hero Girls (Warner Bros.); featuring Max Mittelman as Superman
2019: Harley Quinn (Warner Bros.); featuring James Wolk as Superman

DC Animated Universe
Superman is a major character in the DC Animated Universe, under the portrayal of various different actors. Although still a very difficult character to beat, he is portrayed as being considerably weaker than he is in the comics. He also has a specific set of stylized sound effects whenever his powers are used. Additionally, his personality is very similar to Jerry Siegel and Joe Shuster's original comics, the same one used by John Byrne in the reboot of the DC Universe from 1986: somewhat rough and aggressive, although remaining the personification of moral excellence.

Superman first appears in his eponymous series. As with the comics, he is the sole survivor of Krypton's demise, caused by Brainiac in this continuity. He is portrayed with the same powers and weaknesses, but like average people of Earth cannot breathe in space and thus requires a space suit. He also wears a special lead suit for protection against kryptonite. Superman's reputation becomes jeopardized in the two-parter finale Legacy, where he gets brainwashed by Darkseid and set upon Earth, losing the trust of many, including Professor Hamilton who begins working against him from then on by joining Project Cadmus and giving Lex Luthor an advantage. His baby age, who only appears in The Last Son of Krypton, the first episode, is voiced by Jesse Batten. His teenaged self, who only appears in The Last Son of Krypton, as well as the episode New Kids in Town, is voiced by Jason Marsden. Tim Daly voices the adult character.
Superman next appears in the Batman Beyond two-parter The Call. He wears a different suit of black and silver, but is shown to have aged slower than anyone on Earth, due to his Kryptonian DNA, appearing as a man in his 50s instead of his actual age as Bruce Wayne jokes about. He is first shown disguised as a bystander that is taken hostage by Inque, but he quickly reveals himself and takes her out. He then shows up at the Batcave to recruit Terry McGinnis, Bruce's successor as the new Batman, into the Justice League, apparently in order to help him find a traitor within the league. Bruce and Terry both discover the traitor to be Superman himself, and Bruce gives Terry a piece of kryptonite, referring to the events of Legacy. However, it is then discovered that Superman had been under the control of a starfish-like alien (Starro) many years after Justice League Unlimited ended, that he had saved a long time ago during his and Lobo's captivity under the Preserver as depicted in the Superman: The Animated Series two-parter episode The Main Man. Terry frees Superman, and the two help the rest of the league send the aliens back, he then offers Terry membership in the League only for it to be turned down, later remarking that Terry has a lot more in common with Bruce than he actually thinks, hinting that he may know of Terry's biological relationship with Bruce. Although Tim Daly was available the producers chose to go with Christopher McDonald, the voice of Jor-El in the DCAU as Superman's voice, due to an idea that Superman sounds more like his father as he ages.
Superman next appears in Justice League, now voiced by George Newbern. Daly was supposed to return, and had even done initial recordings, but was ultimately under contract to star in the TV series The Fugitive and had to be replaced. Superman, having already got back his reputation that Darkseid had put at stake in the interim between the end of his show and the start of this one, forms the league, along with Batman. He begins to wonder about what might happen to him after the events of the Justice Lords, what with his counterpart giving into the urge and killing Luthor. Superman was originally designed with a shine in his hair, along with wrinkles and squintier eyes in order to make him look more detailed, but was redesigned again with his look from Superman from the second season onwards after it was not well received. Superman's powers were also significantly toned down to the point where he was depicted as unnaturally weak in the first season, far weaker than his depiction in his own show and Batman Beyond, a running gag being him constantly and easily taken down by foes who are supposed to be a match for him, with Bruce Timm and company admitting they overdid it while toning down his powers, this was also corrected from the second season onwards, restoring his power level to what it was in his series. 
Newbern returns to the role of Superman in Static Shock in the episode "Toys in the Hood", where he visits Dakota and helps the title character battle against Toyman, whom he had been tracking down. In this series, Superman is given full eyes with blue irises, compared to his other appearances within the DCAU.
Superman is again voiced by Newbern in Justice League Unlimited. In this series, he nearly gives into the urge to become like his Justice Lord counterpart, attempting to lobotomize Doomsday, who he instead finally banished into the Phantom Zone, much to the questioning of Batman and the general public. His doubts about not being like his Justice Lord counterpart are fleshed out in Divided We Fall, where a mechanical duplicate of his counterpart points out about his trust from the public and his power. Superman insists that he is not like his counterpart at all. Most noteworthy is after Flash apparently died defeating the Lex Luthor/ Braniac hybrid, he brought Luthor to eye level and said: "I'm not the man that killed President Luthor. Right now, I wish to heaven that I were, but I'm not." It was because of this, Superman considered shutting down the Justice League, only to be talked out of it by Green Arrow. During the series finale, Destroyer, Superman briefly gets the upper hand on a resurrected Darkseid. He explains "I feel like I live in a world made of cardboard.", saying that he thus is always taking care of not to attack too hard or he might kill someone. With Darkseid, however, he says "But you can take it, can't you big man. What we have here is a rare opportunity for me to cut loose, and show you just how powerful I really am." and punches Darkseid hard into the sky, through several buildings, and knocks him back into the ground, creating a huge crater. Darkseid then stuns Superman using the Agony Matrix, which causes him to feel extreme pain in every part of his body, and is about to kill him with a kryptonite knife when he is saved by Luthor, whom had agreed with Superman to stop Darkseid, or in his case, get revenge on him for taking a piece of Brainiac from him.

My Adventures with Superman
An animated series titled My Adventures with Superman was announced in May 2021, and will feature Jack Quaid and Alice Lee leading the voice cast as Clark Kent and Lois Lane. It is said to follow a modern, relatable Clark Kent alongside a fearless, whip smart Lois Lane who are navigating the small tasks of both becoming adults and trying to save the world. The series will premiere in 2023 on HBO Max, as well as on Cartoon Network.

Video games

1978: Superman by Atari for the Atari 2600
1984: Superman III for the Atari 8-bit family of computers (unreleased)
1985: Superman: The Game by First Star Software for the Commodore 64
1987: Superman by Kemco for the Nintendo Entertainment System
1988: Superman: Man of Steel by Tynesoft for the Commodore 64
1988: Superman by Taito; Arcade game
1992: Superman: The Man of Steel by Virgin Interactive for the Master System
1992: Superman by Sunsoft for the Genesis
1994/1995: The Death and Return of Superman by Sunsoft for the Super NES and Genesis
1995: Justice League Task Force by Acclaim for the Super NES and Genesis
1998: Superman by Titus for the Game Boy
1999: Superman by Titus for the Nintendo 64
1999: The Multipath Adventures of Superman: Menace of Metallo by Brilliant Digital for PC (Windows 95/98)
2002: Justice League: Injustice for All by Midway for the Game Boy Advance; Superman is a playable character
2002: Superman: The Man of Steel by Infogrames/Atari for the Xbox
2002/2003: Superman: Shadow of Apokolips by Infogrames/Atari for the PlayStation 2 and GameCube
2003: Superman: Countdown to Apokolips by Infogrames/Atari for the Game Boy Advance
2003: Justice League: Chronicles by Midway for the Game Boy Advance; Superman is a playable character
2005: Justice League TV Games unit by Jakks Pacific; Superman is playable in some games, non–playable in others
2006: Superman: The Greatest Hero by VTech for the V.Smile system
2006: Superman TV Games unit by Jakks Pacific (five different games)
2006: Justice League Heroes by Eidos for the PlayStation 2, Xbox and PlayStation Portable; Superman is a playable character, and is voiced by Crispin Freeman
2006: Superman Returns by Electronic Arts for the PlayStation 2, Xbox & Xbox 360 featuring voices from the cast of the film
2006: Superman Returns by Electronic Arts for the Nintendo DS
2006: Superman Returns: Fortress of Solitude by Electronic Arts for the Game Boy Advance
2008: Mortal Kombat vs. DC Universe by Midway for the PlayStation 3 and Xbox 360
2011: DC Universe Online by Sony Computer Entertainment for the PlayStation 3 and Microsoft Windows
2012: Lego Batman 2: DC Super Heroes by Traveller's Tales for the PlayStation 3 and Xbox 360
2013: Injustice: Gods Among Us by NetherRealm Studios for the PlayStation 3, Xbox 360, Wii U, Windows, PlayStation Vita, and PlayStation 4
2013/2014: Scribblenauts Unmasked by 5th Cell for Wii U and Nintendo 3DS
2014: The Lego Movie Videogame by Traveller's Tales for the PlayStation 4, Xbox One, PlayStation 3 and Xbox 360
2014: Lego Batman 3: Beyond Gotham by Traveller's Tales for the PlayStation 4, Xbox One, PlayStation 3 and Xbox 360
2015: Lego Dimensions by Traveller's Tales for the PlayStation 4, Xbox One, Wii U, PlayStation 3 and Xbox 360
2017: Injustice 2 by NetherRealm Studios for the PlayStation 4 and Xbox One
2018: DC Unchained by FourThirtyThree for Android
2018: Lego DC Super-Villains by Traveller's Tales for the PlayStation 4, Xbox One, Nintendo Switch, and Microsoft Windows.
2022: MultiVersus by Player First Games for the Microsoft Windows, PlayStation 5, Xbox Series X/S, PlayStation 4, and Xbox One; Superman is a playable character, and is reprised by George Newbern from various DC media.
2023: Justice League: Cosmic Chaos by Outright Games for the Microsoft Windows, Playstation 4, Playstation 5, Xbox One, Xbox Series X/S and Nintendo Switch; Superman is a playable character, and is reprised by Nolan North from various DC media.

Theatre and live performances
1940: New York World's Fair – Broadway actor Ray Middleton played the Man of Steel in his first public appearance on July 3 for "Superman Day"
1966: "It's a Bird...It's a Plane...It's Superman" – a Broadway musical; lyrics by Lee Adams, music by Charles Strouse; starring Bob Holiday and Jack Cassidy
2010: "The History of Invulnerability" – a play about the creation of Superman and the childhood of one of his creators: Joe Shuster
2012: "Holy Musical B@man!", a parody musical done by internet theatre troupe StarKid Productions featured Superman portrayed by actor Brian Holden.

Literature and printed media
1942: The Adventures of Superman by George Lowther
1971: Man of Steel, Woman of Kleenex by Larry Niven
1978: Last Son of Krypton by Elliot S! Maggin
1981: Miracle Monday by Elliot S! Maggin
1983: Superman III (novelization) by William Kotzwinkle
1991: "Übermensch!" by Kim Newman
1993: Superman: Doomsday & Beyond by Louise Simonson, illustrated by Dan Jurgens and José Luis García-López
1994: The Death and Life of Superman by Roger Stern
1996: Lois & Clark: A Superman Novel by C. J. Cherryh
2005: It's Superman! by Tom De Haven
2005: Superman Returns (novelization), by Marv Wolfman
2007: The Last Days of Krypton by Kevin J. Anderson
2009: Enemies & Allies by Kevin J. Anderson

Newspaper

Superman was a daily newspaper comic strip which began on January 16, 1939, and a separate Sunday strip was added on November 5, 1939. These strips ran continuously until May 1966. In 1941, the McClure Syndicate had placed the strip in hundreds of newspapers. At its peak, the strip, featuring Superman, was in over 300 daily newspapers and 90 Sunday papers, with a readership of over 20 million.

Attractions and theme park rides

Superman: Escape from Krypton, roller coaster at Six Flags Magic Mountain.
Superman: Ultimate Flight, roller coaster at Six Flags Over Georgia, Six Flags Great Adventure, and Six Flags Great America.
Superman: Ultimate Flight, roller coaster at Six Flags Discovery Kingdom
Superman – Ride of Steel, roller coaster at Six Flags America.
Superman: Krypton Coaster, roller coaster at Six Flags Fiesta Texas.
Superman el Último Escape, roller coaster at Six Flags México.
Superman la Atracción de Acero, roller coaster at Parque Warner Madrid
Superman Escape, roller coaster at Warner Bros. Movie World.
Superman: Tower of Power tower ride at Six Flags Over Texas and Six Flags St. Louis.

Art
2007: Beautiful Superman, a sculpture by David Herbert, exhibited in 2008 in The Hague Sculpture in The Hague.

Parodies

The cartoon Underdog in which Shoeshine Boy becomes "Underdog" with the help of an energy pill.
The cartoon series Groovy Goolies featured dimwitted Frankie as "Super Ghoul".
Walt Disney's Goofy did a parody of Superman with the help of "super goobers" {Peanuts} in which Goofy became "Super Goof" clothed in red underwear with "SG" and a blue cape and endowed with super ears, super sight, super strength, super voice and super flying. Goofy's crime fighting always interrupted his date with Clarabelle Cow.
Warner Brothers' Daffy Duck did a parody of Superman as Stupor Duck.
The 2019 superhero horror film Brightburn is a dark deconstruction of the Superman character.
Superman's image was used in an AIDS awareness campaign by French organization AIDES. Superman was depicted as emaciated and breathing from an oxygen tank, demonstrating that no-one is beyond the reach of the disease, and it can destroy the lives of everyone.

Merchandising

Sunnyland Refining Co., in 1981, marketed jars of creamy and crunchy peanut butter using the familiar image of Superman. In the 50th anniversary publication Fifty Who Made DC Great, it was noted that this was DC's first licensing deal for a brand of food. Soon he had his own hot cocoa mix in 1983.
A Superman pinball machine was produced by Atari in 1979.
Superman is part of the DC Deckbuilding Game by Cryptozoic Entertainment.

Recurring cast

Several actors have made appearances across multiple works in the franchise.

Notes

References
 "O Superman: Music & comics" (by Alan Moore, The Daredevils #5, 1983)

Mass media franchises introduced in 1938
Superman in other media